Abdul Moustapha Ouédraogo (born June 9, 1988) is an Ivorian footballer, who currently plays as a winger for Stilon Gorzów Wielkopolski.

Career 
Moustapha previously played for ASEC Mimosas and Stella Club d'Adjamé, before signing in January 2009 with C.D. Trofense. He played his first professional game on 8 March 2009 against Académica Coimbra in the Liga Sagres.
Moustapha was transferred to Pogoń Szczecin in 2013.

References

External links
 

1988 births
Living people
Footballers from Abidjan
Ivorian footballers
Association football forwards
Stella Club d'Adjamé players
C.D. Trofense players
Al Jazirah Al Hamra Club players
Pogoń Szczecin players
CA Bizertin players
AS Marsa players
Ekstraklasa players
Stilon Gorzów Wielkopolski players
Ivorian expatriate footballers
Expatriate footballers in Portugal
Expatriate footballers in Poland
Expatriate footballers in Tunisia
Expatriate footballers in the United Arab Emirates
Ivorian expatriate sportspeople in Portugal
Ivorian expatriate sportspeople in Poland
Ivorian expatriate sportspeople in Tunisia
Ivorian expatriate sportspeople in the United Arab Emirates